Víctor Manuel "Rivera" Rosario (born August 26, 1966 in Hato Mayor del Rey, Hato Mayor, Dominican Republic) is a former Major League Baseball player. He played one season with the Atlanta Braves in 1990.

References

External links

1966 births
Living people
Aberdeen Arsenal players
Abilene Prairie Dogs players
Atlanta Braves players
Bridgeport Bluefish players
Dominican Republic expatriate baseball players in the United States
Elmira Pioneers players
Greensboro Hornets players

Major League Baseball players from the Dominican Republic
Major League Baseball second basemen
Major League Baseball shortstops
Massachusetts Mad Dogs players
New Britain Red Sox players
People from Hato Mayor del Rey
Richmond Braves players
Rio Grande Valley White Wings players
Scranton/Wilkes-Barre Red Barons players
Sonoma County Crushers players
Stockton Ports players
Toledo Mud Hens players
Winter Haven Red Sox players